Thomas Sørum (born 17 November 1982) is a Norwegian footballer who currently plays for Stoppen . He made his debut for Strømsgodset in 2001, having previously played for Liungen IF and NTG. He was also loaned to Manglerud Star in 2006. After the 2008 season, he was sold to Haugesund from Strømsgodset. On 30 August 2011 it became official that Sørum was leaving for the Swedish club Helsingborgs IF.

International career
Sørum made his debut for the national team in a 1-1 friendly draw against Denmark on 15 January 2012.

Career statistics

Honours

Club

Strømsgodset:
 Tippeligaen: 2013

References

1982 births
Living people
People from Lier, Norway
Norwegian footballers
Norway international footballers
Strømsgodset Toppfotball players
Manglerud Star Toppfotball players
FK Haugesund players
Helsingborgs IF players
Eliteserien players
Norwegian First Division players
Allsvenskan players
Norwegian expatriate footballers
Expatriate footballers in Sweden
Norwegian expatriate sportspeople in Sweden
Sportspeople from Drammen
Association football forwards